Keene Creek is a stream in the U.S. state of Oregon. It is a tributary to Jenny Creek.

Keene Creek was named after Granville Keene, who was killed in 1855 near its banks.

References

Rivers of Oregon
Rivers of Jackson County, Oregon